Milorad M. Drachkovitch (8 November 1921 – 16 June 1996) was a political scientist of Serbian origin. He was born in Belgrade as the posthumous son of Milorad Drašković, Minister of the Interior in the Kingdom of Serbs, Croats, and Slovenes, who had been assassinated. A liberal Serbian nationalist, during World War II Drachkovitch initially joined Chetnik resistance to the Nazi occupation, and later fled the country to escape Communist rule.

Drachkovitch resumed his studies at the University of Geneva, Switzerland, receiving a Bachelor's degree in political science in 1949 followed by a Ph.D. in 1953. From 1955 to 1956 he was a fellow of the Commonwealth Fund and traveled widely. After serving as the director of studies at the College of Europe in Bruges, Belgium, Drachkovitch went to the United States in 1958, where he held a succession of academic posts. He was a visiting assistant professor of political science at the University of California, Berkeley, a fellow at the Russian Research Center at Harvard University and, from 1961 to 1993, a senior fellow at the Hoover Institution on War, Revolution and Peace at Stanford University. He served as the director of the Hoover Archives, and was awarded the title of senior fellow, emeritus, at the Hoover Institution in 1993.

Publications
Les Socialismes français et allemands et le problème de la guerre 1870-1914 (Genève 1953)
De Karl Marx à Léon Blum (Geneva 1954)
United States Aid to Yugoslavia and Poland (D.C. 1963)
Biographical Dictionary of the Comintern (Stanford 1973, 2nd Edition with Branko Lazitch).

References

External links
 Memorial site of Milorad M. Drachkovitch
 The Drachkovitch Library

1921 births
1996 deaths
University of California, Berkeley College of Letters and Science faculty
Harvard University staff
Stanford University staff
Yugoslav emigrants to the United States
Yugoslav expatriates in Switzerland
Yugoslav expatriates in Belgium